Kirill Seleznyov may refer to:

 Kirill Gennadiyevich Seleznyov (b. 1974), Russian businessman
 Kirill Igorevich Seleznyov (b. 1985), Russian footballer